Koi Child was an Australian hip-hop band from Fremantle, Perth, Western Australia. They formed in 2014 through the combination of two bands; Kashikoi and Child's Play. Their self-titled debut album was recorded, mixed and co-produced by Kevin Parker of Tame Impala and was released in March 2016. In 2018, Koi Child disbanded.

Band members

 Shannon Cruz Patterson – vocals (2014–2018)
 Blake Hart – drums (2014–2018)
 Christian Ruggiero – tenor saxophone (2014–2018), baritone saxophone (2016–2018)
 Jamie Canny – alto saxophone (2014–2018)
 Sam Newman – trombone (2014–2018)
 Tom Kenny – keyboards and synthesizers (2014–2017)
 Yann Vissac – bass guitar (2014–2018)

Discography

Studio albums

Awards and nominations

ARIA Music Awards
The ARIA Music Awards is an annual awards ceremony that recognises excellence, innovation, and achievement across all genres of Australian music.

|-
| rowspan="1" | 2016 || rowspan="1" | Koi Child || Best Urban Album || 
|-

WAM Awards
Koi Child have won five awards from eight nominations.

|-
| rowspan="3" | 2015
| rowspan="2" | Koi Child
| Best Urban Act
| 
|-
| Most Popular New Act
| 
|-
| "Black Panda"
| Most Popular Music Video
| 
|-
| rowspan="5" | 2016
| rowspan="2" | Koi Child
| Most Popular Act
| 
|-
| Best Urban Act (tied win with Mathas)
| 
|-
| Koi Child
| Best Album
| 
|-
| Tom Kenny
| Best Keys/Synth Artist
| 
|-
| "1-5-9"
| Most Popular Music Video
| 
|-

References

External links
Koi Child official website

Australian jazz ensembles
Jazz fusion ensembles
Musical groups from Perth, Western Australia